
Gmina Tłuchowo is a rural gmina (administrative district) in Lipno County, Kuyavian-Pomeranian Voivodeship, in north-central Poland.

Villages
Gmina Tłuchowo contains the villages and settlements of Borowo, Jasień, Julkowo, Kamień Kmiecy, Kamień Kotowy, Kłobukowo, Koziróg Leśny, Koziróg Rzeczny, Małomin, Marianki, Michałowo, Mysłakówko, Mysłakowo, Nowa Turza, Podole, Popowo, Rumunki Jasieńskie, Suminek, Tłuchówek, Tłuchowo, Trzcianka, Turza Wilcza, Wyczałkowo and Źródła.

Neighbouring gminas
Gmina Tłuchowo is bordered by the gminas of Brudzeń Duży, Dobrzyń nad Wisłą, Mochowo, Skępe and Wielgie.

References
Polish official population figures 2006

Tluchowo
Lipno County